The BUCS Nationals take place every year, it is a chance for the student community to show off their skills in a competitive environment.

Awards
The winners receive the accolade of being crowned top university korfball club in Britain.  The event is organised by the British Student Korfball Association and features two full days of korfball.

BUSA/BUCS Nationals History

See also
 Korfball

External links
 English Korfball Association
 Scottish Korfball Association

Korfball competitions
Korfball
Recurring sporting events established in 1991
1991 establishments in the United Kingdom
Korfball in the United Kingdom